François Vallier (4 November 1900 – 24 March 1992) was a French cross-country skier. He competed in the men's 18 kilometre event at the 1928 Winter Olympics.

References

External links

1900 births
1992 deaths
French male cross-country skiers
Olympic cross-country skiers of France
Cross-country skiers at the 1928 Winter Olympics
20th-century French people